"All of This" is a song by American rock band Blink-182 from the band's fifth studio album, Blink-182 (2003). The song is a collaboration with musician Robert Smith, frontman of the English rock band The Cure. Lyrically, the song is inspired by a story from producer Jerry Finn's adolescence, in which he was humiliated by a girl he had fallen in love with.

The song was frequently cited as a highlight on the album and received positive reviews. "All of This" was briefly considered to be the album's fifth single, but the idea was shelved when the band broke up in 2005.

Background

"All of This," as well as the song it segues from, "Easy Target," were based on a story from producer Jerry Finn's middle school years. Finn was in love with a female classmate, Holly, who invited him over, only to have her and her friend drench him with a hose; humiliated, he rode home on his bicycle.

The song was musically inspired by The Cure song "The Love Cats" (as was "I Miss You"), and the band decided to reach out to The Cure frontman Robert Smith by phone. The trio did not anticipate he would go for it, considering the band's reputation. Smith, for his part, was bemused as to how he would fit into Blink-182's sound: "I'd heard a couple of singles," he later told Blender, "but I couldn't really see how I could sing on anything or write any words. But the demos for the album that eventually came out were fantastic. I think they suffer in a way that we [The Cure] suffered in that people weren't allowing them to become something else. If another band put that new CD out as their first album, people would go crazy." As for their legitimacy, Smith gave the band advice: "Nobody knows what kind of songs you are going to write in the future and nobody knows the full potential of any band. I really like the music you sent me."

Hoppus was ecstatic at Smith's response; he referred to the call as "an amazing experience, like a dream come true." Hoppus had been significantly influenced by The Cure in his adolescence. After borrowing a cassette version of the band’s album Kiss Me, Kiss Me, Kiss Me from friend Wendy Franklin, he became fixated on "Just Like Heaven”, in high school, he began to dress like frontman Robert Smith, donning eyeliner and "occasionally bright red lipstick" to his high school classes. During the session that produced "All of This," Hoppus went out of his way to purchase a Fender six-string bass, the same model employed on The Cure song "Push".

Smith, who recorded his parts in England, took a significant amount of time recording the song, to the point that the band was unsure of whether or not his contribution would make the record. "We were literally hours from having to turn [the masters] in to the factory when it showed up," said DeLonge. "It gave us all goose bumps to hear Robert's voice on our record, to hear his voice on another song, and to come to the realization that we actually wrote the music to it, because it sounds like a Cure song. We were jumping for joy when it was all said and done."

Music
The song is composed in the key of A major and is set in time signature of common time with a moderate tempo of 112 beats per minute. The vocal range spans from A3 to C#5.

"All of This" is a gothic-tinged pop song that uses strings and guitar effects to create a moody atmosphere.

Reception
Entertainment Weekly Leah Greenblatt called the song a "haunting paean to lost love," and Nick Catucci of The Village Voice referred to it as a "shuffling, string-gilded slow burner," while opining that Smith "has more presence than both of Blink's singers combined." A.D. Amorosi of The Philadelphia Inquirer cited "All of This" as an example of the band delve into new wave. Trevor Kelley of Alternative Press considered it evocative of the Cure's Seventeen Seconds.

The band had discussions as to whether issue "All of This" as the fifth single from Blink-182, but plans were dropped following the band's declaration of an 'indefinite hiatus' in February 2005. In response to the idea of "All of This" becoming a possible single, DeLonge joked "We would love it because it's a bad-ass song, and The Cure's Robert Smith sings on it, and that makes us cooler than everybody else."

Personnel

Blink-182
 Mark Hoppus – bass guitar
 Tom DeLonge – vocals, guitar
 Travis Barker – drums, percussion
Additional musicians
 Robert Smith – vocals

Production
 Jerry Finn – producer
 Tom Lord-Alge – mix engineer
 Brian Gardner – mastering engineer

References

Notes

External links

Blink-182 songs
2003 songs
Songs written by Mark Hoppus
Songs written by Tom DeLonge
Songs written by Travis Barker
Songs written by Robert Smith (musician)